The Marine Corps Security Guard Ribbon is a United States Marine Corps military award that was established by order of Secretary of the Navy John Howard Dalton on 15 July 1997. The award recognizes those Marine Corps personnel who have served as U.S. Embassy Security Guards and is retroactive to 28 January 1949.

Marines assigned to Marine Security Guard duty (MOS 8156) are eligible to receive the ribbon upon completion of 36 months of service at a foreign establishment. Subsequent awards will be made for every 36 months served, either consecutively or cumulatively. The MCSGR may be awarded retroactively to 28 January 1949, the date the first MSGs departed Washington, DC, for their overseas assignments. One award is authorized for the period 28 January 1949 to 15 August 1974, regardless of the number of qualifying periods.

Marines who served successful tours at a lettered MSGBN company headquarters or at HQ MSGBN, Quantico are not eligible to receive this award. On a case-by-case basis, the MCSGR may be awarded posthumously without regard to period of service.

Personnel transferred early for the Good of the Service must have served a minimum of 12 months in the program to be eligible for this award. Personnel transferred due to Relief for Cause are not eligible for the ribbon.

History
To be awarded the Marine Corps Security Guard Ribbon, a service member must hold the Marine Corps military occupational specialty (MOS) 8156 (previously 8151) Marine Corps Security Guard and must have served thirty-six months of service at an American embassy or consulate. The award is only awarded to Marine Security Guards for their service at American Embassies or Consulates in a foreign country.

References

External links

Awards and decorations of the United States Marine Corps
Awards established in 1997
Military ribbons of the United States